Eupnigodes is a genus of slant-faced grasshoppers in the family Acrididae. There are at least two described species in Eupnigodes, both found in the western United States.

Species
These two species belong to the genus Eupnigodes:
 Eupnigodes megocephala (McNeill, 1897) (big-headed grasshopper)
 Eupnigodes sierranus (Rehn & Hebard, 1909) (sierran white-whiskered grasshopper)

References

Further reading

 
 
 

Acrididae genera
Articles created by Qbugbot
Gomphocerinae